Rodriguesophis is a genus of snakes in the family Colubridae. The genus contains three species, all of which are endemic to Brazil.

Description
The genus Rodriguesophis has the following characteristics. The rostral is spatulate and straight, not upturned. The loreal is absent.  A dark nuchal collar is present, which is more or less distinct depending on the species. Juveniles are bright red dorsally.

Species
The following three species are recognized as being valid.
 Rodriguesophis chui (Rodrigues, 1993) – muçurana-nariguda-das-dunas (in Portuguese)
 Rodriguesophis iglesiasi (Gomes, 1915) – Gomes's pampas snake
 Rodriguesophis scriptorcibatus (Rodrigues, 1993) – muçurana-nariguda-do-São-Francisco (in Portuguese)

Etymology
The generic name, Rodriguesophis, is in honor of Brazilian herpetologist Miguel Trefaut Rodrigues. The specific names, chui and iglesiasi, are in honor of Brazilian zoologists Tien Hsi Chu and Francisco Iglesias, respectively.

References

Further reading
Grazziotin FG, Zaher H, Murphy RW, Scrocchi G, Benavides MA, Zhang Y-P, Bonatto SL (2012). "Molecular phylogeny of the New World Dipsadidae (Serpentes: Colubroidea): a reappraisal". Cladistics 28 (5): 437–459. (Rodriguesophis, new genus).

Colubrids
Snake genera